Jaegaseung were descendants of Jurchen people who lived in northeastern Korea. They formed villages of married lay monks and produced oatmeal paper called hwangji which was used to pay their taxes. The monastic identity of the lay monks was seen as anti-socialist by the government of North Korea, and, consequently, the Jaegaseung were forcibly assimilated into Korean culture on the orders of North Korean president Kim Il-sung.

Origins and history

The mountains of northern Hamgyŏng Province were traditionally inhabited by the Jurchens, a semi-nomadic Tungusic people. In the mid-fifteenth century, King Sejong conquered the region as far north as the Tumen River, which even today marks Korea's northern border, and established Korean colonies in the area. Many Jurchens accepted Korean hegemony and played crucial roles in frontier defense against other Jurchen tribes more hostile to Korean presence. By the sixteenth century, the Jurchens living under Korean rule were often married to ethnic Koreans and had become increasingly agricultural. They were also economically and militarily linked to the central Korean state. At the same time, they retained close contacts with independent Jurchens across the Tumen.

By the late sixteenth century, however, conflicts over land between indigenous Jurchens and Korean settlers were increasingly frequent. The Jurchen chieftain Nitanggae rebelled in 1583, severely undermining the Korean state's control of the area. The crisis was exacerbated by the large-scale Japanese invasion in 1592 during which Katō Kiyomasa conquered large parts of Hamgyŏng, leading to a breakdown of the Korean administration and major conflicts between Jurchens and Koreans.

Beginning in around 1590, independent Jurchen chieftains such as Nurhaci and Bujantai were competing for hegemony over their cousins in Korean territory. Having routed Bujantai in 1607, Nurhaci successfully removed most Jurchens in northern Hamgyŏng into his newfound kingdom north of the Tumen between 1607 and 1609. Nurhaci's Jurchens would eventually adopt a new Manchu identity in 1635 and go on to conquer China, founding China's final imperial dynasty. Nurhaci and his successors continued to demand the forcible "repatriation" of Jurchens in Korea until 1644, although some Jurchens successfully evaded deportation and remained in Korea with the support of sympathetic Korean authorities.

It is generally agreed that the Jaegaseung were descendants of these Jurchen communities who avoided capture, assimilated into Korean society.

Culture
Ultimately, although many cultural practices of the Jaegaseung were identical or similar to the folk traditions of Northern Hamgyong province, the community still maintained several distinctive and divergent customs. The community, unlike their neighbours, wore red clothes during Jesa rites, cremated their dead, allowed women to wear trousers, and were largely vegetarian with the exception of important days. If a Jaegaseung female marries a man outside of the community, then the man was to move into the Jaegaseung community and shave his head.

The homes of Jaegaseung were described as composing of one, big room and a fence around the house. Due the influence of shamanism, they did not plant trees around their homes. The villages also had a hierarchy, with each Jaegaseung settlement having a chief, who was well versed in the Buddhist scriptures and ceremonies. The chief would also take care of administrative tasks such as taxes or tribute.

When a member of the community was sick, a ceremony called 'Daesangwi' (대산귀) was to be held by the Tumen river in order to ensure the wellbeing of the person and village. The rites involved offerings of rice cakes and a pig in front of a wooden pole, and were reported to last for an entire night. The ceremony was unique to the Jaegaseung communities, and was not practiced by other residents of Northern Hamgyong.

Jaegaseung girls and women were notorious in mainstream Korean society for always exposing their breasts even in public, which was considered scandalous by other Koreans.

Some Jaegaseung refugees who fled to South Korea during the Korean War were known to have preserved some cultural aspects of their communities, and one work song regarding the community's traditional method of smelting iron was broadcast on South Korean radio.

Language
Despite their isolation from other residents in the area, the Jaegaseung communities spoke the typical  of the region.

However, a difference between the dialect of the Jaegaseung and other speakers of Yukjin Korean was still noticeable as of the 1930s, to the point that instances of difficulty in communication between local administrative officials and Jaegaseung villages was not uncommon.

The only language considered vulgar among the Jaegaseung was the phrase '범이야' ('It's a tiger'), which likely is a reflection of the community's fear of tigers, which were historically common in the region.

See also
Buddhist monasticism
Ethnic minorities in North Korea
Ethnoreligious group
Korean Buddhism

References

Works cited

Further reading

Ethnic groups in North Korea
Buddhism in Korea
Ethnoreligious groups
Jurchen history
Extinct ethnic groups